The 1952–53 season was Colchester United's eleventh season in their history and their third season in the Third Division South, the third tier of English football. Alongside competing in the Third Division South, the club also participated in the FA Cup. Colchester reached the third round of the FA Cup for the second season running, but were knocked out by Second Division side Rotherham United after a replay. The club struggled in the league, eventually finishing 22nd of 24 teams which would ultimately cost manager Jimmy Allen his job.

Season overview
The season began with a Layer Road crowd of 14,674 witnessing a 0–0 draw with local rivals Ipswich Town, and in the early stages of the campaign, the club remained mid-table. In the FA Cup, Colchester disposed of Weymouth in the first round following a replay, and then Llanelli in the second round, before once again facing Second Division Yorkshire opposition in Rotherham United. After drawing 2–2 at Millmoor and forcing a replay, Colchester lost the Layer Road replay 2–0.

In the latter stages of the season, a poor run of just one point from six games saw United slip from 13th-position to 22nd, just one place and two points above the re-election positions. Meanwhile, forward Kevin McCurley had justified manager Jimmy Allen's £750 outlay with a return of 19 goals. However, with Allen's style of play criticised by supporters and his unwillingness to reduce the playing staff as requested by the board saw Allen tender his resignation on 2 May 1953.

Players

Transfers

In

 Total spending:  ~ £3,075

Out

Match details

Third Division South

Results round by round

League table

Matches

FA Cup

Squad statistics

Appearances and goals

|-
!colspan="14"|Players who appeared for Colchester who left during the season

|}

Goalscorers

Disciplinary record

Clean sheets
Number of games goalkeepers kept a clean sheet.

Player debuts
Players making their first-team Colchester United debut in a fully competitive match.

See also
List of Colchester United F.C. seasons

References

General
Books

Websites

Specific

1952-53
English football clubs 1952–53 season